Peeramon is a rural town and locality in the Tablelands Region, Queensland, Australia.

Geography 
The locality is bounded to the east by Lake Barrine Road and to the south-east by the Johnstone River.

There are a number of neighbourhoods in Peeramon (from north-west to south-east):

 Chumbrumba, taking its name from a railway station, named by the Queensland Railways Department on 25 April 1910, using an Aboriginal name for a forest near the railway station
 Weerimba, another railway station name from 14 October 1911, using an Aboriginal name for the tooth billed bower bird
 Tula , another railway station named on 14 October 1911, using an  Aboriginal name for a species of possum

History 
The town's name is an Aboriginal word, referring to a local hill. The name was assigned by the Queensland Railways Department on 25 April 1910.

Lake Eacham State School opened on 1911. It was built by the Sydes Brothers, who were chosen from the tenders called in September 1910. A teacher's residence was built in 1917. In 1919, it was renamed Peeramon State School. It closed in 1959. It was at 107 Mckenzie Road (corner Peeramon School Road).

The Millaa Millaa branch railway opened from Yungaburra to Kureen (via Peeramon) on 18 October 1910.

The Peeramon Methodist Church opened on  Thursday 1 August 1918.

Education 
There are no schools in Peeramon. The nearest government primary schools are Yunaburra State School in neighbouring Yungaburra to the north and Malanda State School in neighbouring Malanda to the south. The nearest government secondary school is Malanda State High School in Malanda.

References

Further reading

External links 

 

Towns in Queensland
Tablelands Region
Localities in Queensland